The Tehran Monolingual Corpus (TMC) is a large-scale Persian monolingual corpus. TMC is suited for Language Modeling and relevant research areas in Natural Language Processing.

The corpus is extracted from Hamshahri Corpus and ISNA news agency website. The quality of Hamshahri corpus is improved for language modeling purpose by a series of tokenization and spell-checking steps.

TMC comprises more than 250 million words. The total number of unique words (with frequency of two or more) of the corpus is about 300 thousand, which is relatively good for a highly-inflectional language like Persian.

TMC is created by Natural Language Processing Lab of University of Tehran. The corpus is free for research use, after obtaining permission from the corpus aggregator.

See also
 Bijankhan Corpus
 Hamshahri Corpus

External links
 TMC description page

Persian corpora
Applied linguistics
Linguistic research
Natural language processing